Tony Maudsley (born 30 January 1968) is an English actor. He is best known for his portrayal of hairdresser Kenneth Du Beke in the hit ITV sitcom Benidorm, and George Shuttleworth in the ITV soap opera Coronation Street (2020–present).

His other notable credits include Martin in the BBC One sitcom Eyes Down (2003–2004), Graham in the ITV2 sitcom The Job Lot (2013–2014), and George Shuttleworth in the ITV soap opera Coronation Street (2020–present).

Maudsley made his panto debut in 2016 as Dame Trott in Jack and the Beanstalk, at the Theatre Royal, Nottingham. He returned to pantomime the year after, playing a completely different part – the Genie of the Lamp, in Aladdin, at the Swansea Grand Theatre. In 2020 he made another panto appearance as Kenneth the Cabin Boy in Peter Pan at the Liverpool Empire.

Career
His film career started when he landed a role in, A Life for a Life, in 1998 where he played the part of Stefan Kiszko. He also played many small parts on television in between acting in films.

He played the character of Joshua in the BBC Radio 4 situation comedy Revolting People and also appeared in series 3, episodes 5 & 6 of the popular ITV series Doc Martin as a postman. From 2011 until 2018, when the series was cancelled, Maudsley appeared in the ITV award-winning comedy Benidorm, playing hairdresser Kenneth Du Beke. He also appeared in series 18, episode 14 of the popular award-winning ITV police drama Heartbeat.

Tony Maudsley appeared in two episodes of Sky Living's series The Spa as Stephen/Stephanie. He also appeared in ITV's Northern Lights as the character "Doddy", in 2006.

In 2016 he performed the role of Edna Turnblad in the touring season of Hairspray. In late 2017 he featured as "Kenneth the Hairdresser/Part-time slave" in Swansea Grand Theatre's production of Aladdin.

Filmography

Television
{| class="wikitable sortable"
|-
! Year !! Title !! Role !! Notes
|-
| 1991–1992
| rowspan="2"|Coronation Street 
| Rovers Drinker  
| Uncredited; 2 episodes
|-
| rowspan="2"|1995
| Bailey
| Episode #1.3886 
|- 
| The Biz
| Roy
| Unknown episodes
|-
| 1997
| Underworld
| Gerald
| Main role; 5 episodes 
|-
| 1998 
| A Life for a Life 
| Stefan Kiszko 
| Television film
|-
| rowspan="4"|2000
| The Wilsons
| Richard
| All 6 episodes  
|-
| Queer as Folk
| FaggotMan
| 2 episodes 
|- 
| City Central
| Arnie/Reggie
| Episode: "Nutcase"
|-
| Where the Heart Is
| Mark Hall
| Episode: "Legacy"
|-
| rowspan="4"|2001
| Gentlemen's Relish 
| Job Agency Manager 
| Television film
|-
| In a Land of Plenty
| Simon Freeman
| Main role; 6 episodes 
|-
| Peak Practice 
| Ian Fair
| Episode: "Suffer the Little Children"
|-
| Perfect Strangers
| Peter 
| 3 episodes
|-
| 2001–2002
| Nice Guy Eddie
| O'Malley
| 4 episodes (Including pilot)
|-
| rowspan="3"|2001
| Merseybeat
| Simon Lascarides
| Episode: "Crying Out Loud"
|-
| My Beautiful Son 
|  Frank 
| rowspan="2"|Television film
|-
| Doc Martin 
| Billy May 
|-
| rowspan="3"|2002
| Rose and Maloney
| David McVay
| Episodes: "Pilot: Parts 1 & 2"
|-
| Foyle's War
| Bill Ferris
| Episode: "A Lesson in Murder"
|-
| Young Arthur 
| Aloysius 
| Television film
|-
| 2003
| My Uncle Silas
| Pikey
| Episode: "Shandy Lil"
|-
| 2003, 2014
| Holby City
| Mike Handsley; Louis Herrara 
| 2 episodes
|-
| rowspan="2"|2003 
| Murphy's Law
| Danny
| Episode: "Reunion"
|-
| Ready When You Are Mr. McGill 
| Ted 
| Television film
|-
| 2003–2004
| Eyes Down
| Martin
| All 15 episodes
|-
| 2004
| The Last Detective
| Billy Muldoon
| Episode: "Christine" 
|-
| rowspan="2"|2005
| The Virgin Queen
| Captain Morgan
| Series 1: Episode 2
|-
| The Ghost Squad
| Brendan
| Episode: "Firewall"
|-
| rowspan="4"|2006
| Northern Lights
| Doddy
| 2 episodes
|-
| The Street
| Frannie Doran
| Episode: "The Flasher"
|-
| Strictly Confidential
| Dave
| Series 1: Episode 4
|-
| Masterpiece Mystery!  
| Mr. Berry 
| Episode: "The Sally Lockhart Mysteries: The Ruby in the Smoke" 
|-
| rowspan="4"|2007
| Lilies
| Sergeant Dodd
| Episode: "The White Charger"
|-
| The Royal
| Jimmy Beatie
| 4 episodes
|-
| Wire in the Blood
| Barry Davies
| Episode: "The Colour of Amber"
|-
| Doc Martin
| Dave the Postman
| 2 episodes
|-
| rowspan="3"|2008
| Waking the Dead
| Terry Ryan
| Episodes: "Sins: Parts 1 & 2"
|-
| Inspector George Gently
| Madsen
| Episode: "The Burning Man"
|-
| A Place of Execution
| DS Tommy Clough
| 3 episodes
|-
| rowspan="5"|2009
| Law & Order: UK
| Mike Turner
| Episode: "Care" 
|-
| Heartbeat
| Lennie Phillips
| Episode: "The Runaways"
|-
| The Bill
| Eamonn Fuller
| Episode: "Unforgiven"
|-
| Victoria Wood's Midlife Christmas 
| Postman 
| BBC Christmas Special 
|-
| The Day of the Triffids
| Blind Police Officer
| TV mini-series; 2 episodes
|-
| rowspan="3"|2010
| Agatha Christie's Poirot 
| Supt Crossfield
| Episode: "Three Act Tragedy"
|-
| Mo 
| Peter Kilfoyle
| Television film
|-
| Garrow's Law
| Robert Stubbs
| Series 2: Episode 1
|-
| 2011
| Being Human
| Graham (Obsidian)
| Episode: "Type 4"
|-
| 2011–2018
| Benidorm
| Kenneth Du Beke
| Series regular; 52 episodes
|-
| rowspan="2"|2011
| Monroe
| Mr. Fraser
| Series 1: Episode 6
|-
| Emmerdale 
| Mr Lawson
| 5 episodes 
|-
| rowspan="2"|2012
| Sport Relief 2012
| Kenneth Du Beke
| Benidorm meets Britain's Got Talent 
|-
| Secrets and Words
| JJ Roscoe
| Episode: "Love Letters"
|-
| rowspan="2"|2013
| Blandings
| Cyril Wellbeloved
| 3 episodes
|-
| The Spa
| Stephen/Stephanie
| 2 episodes
|-
| 2013–2014
| The Job Lot
| Graham
| Main role; 12 episodes
|-
| 2013
| New Tricks
| Simon Pennyman
| Episode: "Cry Me a River"
|-
| 2014
| Edge of Heaven
| Joe
| Series 1: Episode 6
|-
| 2015
| Ordinary Lies
| Ralf Kavanagh
| Series 1: Episode 3
|-
| 2017
| The Royal Variety Performance 2017 
| Kenneth Du Beke
| TV special
|-
| 2019
| Summer of Rockets
| Spearman
| 3 episodes 
|-
| 2020 
| Dun Breedin'''
| Jean 
| Series 1: Episode 7; voice only 
|- 
| 2020–present
| Coronation Street| George Shuttleworth
| Series regular 
|}

Film

Guest appearancesThis Morning (1998, 2014)Strictly Confidential: Behind the Scenes (2006)Harry Potter and the Order of the Phoenix: T4 Movie Special (2007)Loose Women (2011, 2013)Big Brother's Bit on the Side (2012)Keep It in the Family (2014)Lorraine (2017, 2020)Benidorm: 10 Years on Holiday (2018)Granada Reports (2018)Celebrity Antiques Road Trip (2018)Tipping Point: Lucky Stars (2019)Pointless Celebrities'' (2019)

Theatre credits

Pantomime Roles

Other Theatre Roles

External links

1968 births
Living people
English male film actors
Male actors from Liverpool
English male soap opera actors
20th-century English male actors
21st-century English male actors
Alumni of the Royal Welsh College of Music & Drama